Divine Rapture is an uncompleted film that had been cast in 1995 with Marlon Brando, Johnny Depp, Debra Winger, and John Hurt.

Background

Divine Rapture is the story of a set of miracles in a small 1950's Irish community. The small Irish town of Ballycotton in County Cork where filming took place in the summer of 1995 expected to generate significant revenue from the production. Two weeks into production, however, the filming stopped abruptly as the escrow account for the production company, CineFin, was found to be non-existent. Only 24 minutes of actual film footage had been shot.

Documentary
In 2009, Hot Shot Films produced the documentary Ballybrando''', recounting the story with interviews of cast, crew and production team and including producer Barry Navidi, who had worked for six years to get Divine Rapture made. The documentary also includes scenes from the film. A headstone stands in Ballycotton's Main Street erected by local potter Stephen Pearce marking the event. It reads "Divine Rapture born 10th July 1995, died 23rd July 1995, RIP". Ballybrando ends with the news that Navidi is reworking the script under a new title, Holy Mackerel'', and that he hopes to film it in Ireland.

References 

1990s unfinished films
English-language Irish films